Brandi Bradley is a state representative from Littleton, Colorado. A Republican, Bradley represents Colorado House of Representatives District 39, which chiefly includes the rural sections of Douglas County but includes part of Highlands Ranch, and all of Lone Tree, Castle Pines, Roxborough Park, and Meridian. (The district excludes Parker and Castle Rock.)

Background
Bradley lives in Littleton, Colorado and works as a physical therapist.

Elections
In the 2022 Colorado House of Representatives election, Bradley defeated her Democratic Party opponent, winning 58.06% of the total votes cast.

References

External links
 Legislative website
 Campaign website

21st-century American politicians
Living people
American physiotherapists
People from Littleton, Colorado
21st-century American women politicians
People from Nashville, Tennessee
Middle Tennessee State University alumni
Regis University alumni
Year of birth missing (living people)
Republican Party members of the Colorado House of Representatives